The Rushdie Affair: The Novel, the Ayatollah, and the West is a book written by historian Daniel Pipes, published in 1990. It focuses on events surrounding The Satanic Verses. The afterword was written by Koenraad Elst.

The first part of the book describes The Satanic Verses and Ayatollah Khomeini's edict, explaining why Rushdie's book became a controversy . The second part describes responses to the text and criticizes censorship of the book in some countries.

Reception
Edward Mortimer, in The New York Times, called the book "an extremely well-written and clear analysis of the issues raised". Other positive reviews appeared in the Library Journal, and the Philadelphia Inquirer. the LA Times,

For François Dupuis-Déri (Columbia University), Pipes book can be understood in the neoconservative idea of the "Clash of Civilizations".

According to Emilie Réné, in Les Cahiers du CERI (CERI is a French public institution in political science), Pipes' essay "suffers from oversimplification".

Editions
New York: Birch Lane, 1990
Paperback edition: New Delhi: Voice of India, 1998

References

External links
 Book website

Books about Islamism
Books about Islamic fundamentalism
Non-fiction books about jihadism
Salman Rushdie
1990 non-fiction books